Henry Antone "Cotton" Knaupp (August 13, 1889 – July 6, 1967) was a Major League Baseball player. A shortstop during his major league career, Knaupp batted from the right side and threw with his right hand.

Knaupp spent parts of two seasons in the major leagues with the Cleveland Naps, known today as the Cleveland Indians. He appeared in 31 games, compiling a .184 batting average, a .252 on-base percentage, and a .245 slugging percentage in 98 at bats. Knaupp continued playing professionally after the end of his major league career, and he achieved a notable milestone in 1916. While playing second base for the New Orleans Pelicans on August 8, 1916, Knaupp became the only player in the history of the Southern Association to turn an unassisted triple play.

External links

References

1889 births
1967 deaths
Cleveland Naps players
Major League Baseball shortstops
Minor league baseball managers
Victoria Rosebuds players
New Orleans Pelicans (baseball) players
Montgomery Rebels players
San Antonio Bronchos players
Beaumont Exporters players
Chattanooga Lookouts players
Gulfport Tarpons players
Baseball players from San Antonio